Granadilla is a ghost town in Spain. It is located in Extremadura. Since 1960 it belongs to Zarza de Granadilla's municipality. On 24 June 1955 its residents had to leave when the Spanish Council of Ministers built a reservoir. Currently, the area is a summer campsite for young people and tourists.

Further reading 
 Salazar y Acha, Jaime de (2000). La casa del Rey de Castilla y León en la Edad Media (1ª ed.) Centro de Estudios Políticos y Constitucionales. 
 Ibáñez de Segovia, Gaspar (1777). Memorias históricas del Rei D. Alonso el Sabio i observaciones a su chronica OLCL 458042314
 González Crespo, Esther (1988). 'Els de la señorialización nobiliaria al sur del Duero: concejos de villa-y-tierra frente a la señorialización "menor"' (Estudio a partir de casos del sector occidental: señoríos abulenses y salmantinos) Revista d'historia medieval (Universitat de València: Departamento de Historia Medieval): 275–338

References 

 

Geography of the Province of Cáceres
Ghost towns in Spain
Extremadura